The ZANU–PF Building is a 15-story high-rise building in Harare, Zimbabwe, which serves as the headquarters of ZANU–PF, the country's ruling party. The top floors of the building hold the offices of the ZANU–PF Politburo, lower floors hold other party offices, and the first floor is home to the ZANU Archives, which holds many records from the Rhodesian Bush War. The building hosts annual meetings of the party's politburo, central committee, and other organizations.

Location 
The ZANU–PF Building is located in Harare, Zimbabwe, at the corner of Samora Machel Avenue and Rotten Row, next to Willoughby Crescent.

History 
Fundraising for a new ZANU–PF headquarters began on 24 October 1983, when the party set a goal of raising Z$15 million in one year. Ultimately paid for by the Communist Party of China, construction began in the late 1980s, and the building was completed in 1990. Constructed during the post-independence building boom, the ZANU–PF Building, unlike many others at the time, was designed by Zimbabwean architects, Peter Martin and Tony Wales-Smith. At the time of its completion, it was the tallest building in Harare. It became nicknamed the "Shake Shake" building, for its resemblance to Chibuku Shake Shake, a type of sorghum beer sold in cartons.

Architecture 
The ZANU–PF Building is a 15-story grey concrete structure, topped by a large emblem of a cockerel, a symbol of ZANU–PF. It is of the postmodern style, and is sometimes described as Brutalist.

See also 
 List of tallest buildings in Zimbabwe

References 

Buildings and structures in Harare
Headquarters of political parties
Office buildings completed in 1990
Politics of Zimbabwe
Postmodern architecture
ZANU–PF